Barbie: Princess Adventure, Barbie Princess Adventure, Barbie Princess Adventures or Barbie: Princess Adventures is a 2020 computer-animated musical adventure comedy children's streaming television film directed by Conrad Helten and written by Ann Austen which was first released on Netflix in the United States on September 1.

The 37th entry in the Barbie film series, this is the first Barbie-branded production produced by Mattel Television since their mid-2019 rebrand from Mattel Creations and also Mainframe Studios since their announcement to return to their naming origins as Mainframe Entertainment on 16 March 2020 as part of a rebrand from their previous name, Rainmaker Studios. It is the second television film in the Barbie media franchise after Barbie: Dolphin Magic from late 2017 and would be the catalyst for Mattel shifting the focus of the franchise to television forays.

Production
It is the first film adaptation of the TV series, Barbie: Dreamhouse Adventures, as Dolphin Magic was marketed by Mattel as its "spiritual" pilot.

Plot
Barbie takes a road trip to the Kingdom of Floravia, having being invited by Floravia's princess Amelia. Barbie discovers that Amelia, whose life is rigidly controlled by her royal advisor Alfonso, wants to switch places with her for a week because the two look almost identical. Barbie agrees, and Amelia goes on to enjoy a week of freedom before her coronation. Amelia is kidnapped by her fiancé Prince Johan, who uncovers the ruse and wants to force Amelia to marry him so he can rule both his country and Floravia. Barbie rescues Amelia, and they foil Johan's plot. Afterwards, Amelia is crowned, and both Barbie and Amelia agree to remain true to themselves.

Voice cast
The voice cast are as follows:

Other characters include Rose Ross, Snowy and Morning Star as well as Barbie's puppies; Taffy, Honey, DJ and Rookie.

Soundtrack 

The eponymous soundtrack album was released on August 28, 2020 on multiple digital music streaming services.

Reception
Jennifer Green of Common Sense Media gave the film a positive review, saying "it's hard not to admit that these animated adventures offer upbeat fun." Screen Rant noted that the film bore many similarities to The Princess Switch film series.

See also

 Barbie (media franchise)
 Barbie Dreamhouse Adventures
 Barbie as the Princess and the Pauper
 Barbie: The Princess & the Popstar

References

External links
Production website

2020 television films
2020 computer-animated films
English-language Netflix original films
Barbie films
2020s Canadian films
2020s American animated films
Canadian children's animated films
American children's animated adventure films
American children's animated musical films